My Own Worst Enemy is an album by Ed O.G. and Pete Rock, released in 2004. The album's single, "Wishing", included a guest appearance from Masta Ace.

It was reissued in 2016.

Production
The album consists of 10 songs, seven of them produced by Rock, with additional production from Diamond D and DJ Revolution. The guests included Jaysaun, Masta Ace, and Diamond D. The album was recorded over a period of two years, due to Rock's touring and other production responsibilities.

Critical reception
PopMatters called Rock's production "always relaxed, almost stoned; the organic jazz vibe produces a mild, yet cerebral high when punctuated with his trademark horns." Remix wrote that "on 'Boston', a somber guitar loop and subtle chimes are stretched across sturdy drums for Edo to lyrically praise his hometown, and the bouncy 'Stop Dat' utilizes chopped space-age effects."

Track listing

Album singles

References

2004 albums
Pete Rock albums
Albums produced by Pete Rock
Albums produced by Diamond D
Ed O.G. albums